Ulrik Arneberg (born 22 July 1987) is a Norwegian football defender.

He joined the youth team of Stabæk from Ready ahead of the 2004 season. Ahead of the 2006 season he was drafted into the first team. He got two Norwegian Premier League games in 2006. In early 2007 he was loaned out to Skeid in the Norwegian First Division. Ahead of the 2008 season he joined Asker permanently. After many years there, captaining the team since 2009, he joined Mjøndalen IF ahead of the 2014 season.

Career statistics

References

1987 births
Living people
Footballers from Oslo
Norwegian footballers
Stabæk Fotball players
Skeid Fotball players
Asker Fotball players
Mjøndalen IF players
Eliteserien players

Association football defenders